Bryconacidnus is a genus of characins found in tropical South America.

Species
There are currently 5 recognized species in this genus:
 Bryconacidnus ellisi (N. E. Pearson, 1924)
 Bryconacidnus hemigrammus (N. E. Pearson, 1924)
 Bryconacidnus hypopterus (Fowler, 1943)
 Bryconacidnus paipayensis (N. E. Pearson, 1929)
 Bryconacidnus pectinatus (Vari & Siebert, 1990)

References

Characidae
Fish of South America